Julia Eichhorn (born 11 July 1983) is a German skeleton racer who has competed since 1999. Her best Skeleton World Cup finish was fifth at Königssee in February 2007.

Eichhorn's best finish at the FIBT World Championships was 19th in the women's event at St. Moritz in 2007.

References
FIBT profile

1983 births
Living people
German female skeleton racers
20th-century German women
21st-century German women